Daniel Arturo Cambronero Solano (born January 8, 1986) is a Costa Rican football goalkeeper currently playing for La U Universitarios.

Club career
After coming through the youth ranks at Saprissa, Cambronero made his professional debut for Puntarenas. He moved to UCR in 2007 and joined Herediano in 2011.

International career
Cambornero made his debut for Costa Rica in a May 2009 friendly match against Venezuela (1-1).

He was a non-playing squad member at the 2009 CONCACAF Gold Cup.

Personal life
He is married to Solange Rodríguez and they have two children, Itzel and Danny.

References

External links

1986 births
Living people
Footballers from San José, Costa Rica
Association football goalkeepers
Costa Rican footballers
Costa Rican expatriate footballers
Costa Rica international footballers
Deportivo Saprissa players
Puntarenas F.C. players
C.F. Universidad de Costa Rica footballers
C.S. Herediano footballers
C.D. Malacateco players
Liga FPD players
Liga Nacional de Fútbol de Guatemala players
2009 CONCACAF Gold Cup players
2011 Copa Centroamericana players
2013 Copa Centroamericana players
2014 FIFA World Cup players
2014 Copa Centroamericana players
Copa Centroamericana-winning players
Costa Rican expatriate sportspeople in Guatemala
Expatriate footballers in Guatemala